Campiña Sur may refer to:
 Campiña Sur (Badajoz)
 Campiña Sur (Córdoba)